Paul Zed (born December 31, 1956) is a Canadian lawyer, professor, and politician.

Early life and education
Paul Zed was born in Toronto and received his early education from local Saint John, New Brunswick schools, graduating from St. Malachy's High School with honors, a Bachelor of Arts degree from Dalhousie University (BA 1977), a Bachelor of Laws degree from the University of New Brunswick (LL.B. 1980) and a Masters of Laws degree from the London School of Economics (LL.M. 1981). He completed the Directors Education Program of the Institute of Corporate Directors through the Rotman School of Management, Toronto (ICD.D May, 2012). He is the oldest of seven children of Saint John dentist Dr. Leesha and Amelia (deceased) Zed.

Career
As a successful lawyer and businessman, Zed is a member of the New Brunswick, Ontario, Canadian and International Bar Associations.

He was also a lecturer in Contract Law at the Faculty of Law at the University of Ottawa from 1982 to 1984.  He then became a senior partner at Clark Drummie & Company working in the area of corporate, commercial and securities law, including lead counsel to a large power utility, New Brunswick Power, while also teaching business law at the Business School at the University of New Brunswick from 1984 to 1993. In October 2009 he was appointed Chairman of the Presidents Advisory Board for Cisco Systems Canada. Until January 2013 he was legal counsel to the Canadian law firm Barry Spalding.  In September 2015,  Zed was appointed as the Chairman of the President's Advisory Board of Rogers Enterprise Business Unit, a division of Rogers Communications Inc. He also served on the advisory boards of T4G Limited and Smart Employee Benefits Inc. In May 2018 he was named Counsel and Strategic Advisor for the International Law firm McCarthy Tetrault and is on the board of Facedrive Inc, and Lester B Pearson College of the Pacific and Chairs the board of the London Goodenough Association of Canada

Political career
In 1993, he was first elected to the House of Commons in Ottawa as the Member of Parliament for the riding of Fundy Royal, New Brunswick.  Zed was the first and youngest Liberal ever elected in the riding's history.

During his parliamentary career Zed served as the Chairman of several important committees of the House of Commons including the Standing Committee on Industry, Government Operations and Procedure and House Affairs.

He has authored reports on banking, financing and doing business with governments. He is also considered an expert on ethics and governance as the author of the first major piece of legislation on Lobbying and Ethics.

Zed founded and chaired the all-party Sugar Caucus opposing unfair American trade practices and also founded and chaired the all-party credit card caucus working with Canadian banks and retailers.

In 1996, Prime Minister Jean Chrétien named Zed the Parliamentary Secretary to the Leader of the Government.

Upon his return to the private sector in 1997, Zed co-founded a very successful public policy and business advisory company in Ottawa, Summa Strategies Canada Inc., and served as its President for eight years representing some of the largest American and Canadian companies and their CEO's with offices in Ottawa, Washington and London.

Upon re-election to Parliament in 2004, Zed was named Chair of the Committee on Public Safety and National Security reviewing the Anti-terrorism Act and also served on the Standing Committees on Access to Information, Privacy and Ethics, and the Standing Committee on Transport, Infrastructure and Communities serving as Official Opposition Critic.

A founding member of the Urban Cities and Communities Caucus hosting dozens of meetings with provincial governments and Canada's big city mayors, publishing a report 'Foundations for a Nation' on Canada's infrastructure deficit.

In 2008, he was appointed National Co-Chair for the Liberal Party of Canada leadership campaign of  Michael Ignatieff and subsequently he was named Chief of Staff and Chief Strategist to the Ignatieff while he was Leader of the Opposition.

In September 2009, he was appointed Chairman of the President's Advisory Board for Cisco Systems Canada with head offices in Toronto.

Zed is also very active in Canadian and Atlantic Canada legal and community affairs, including a member of the Board of Directors of Enterprise Saint John, the United Way of Greater Saint John, Finance Chair for Romero House soup kitchen and a founding member of the Lily Lake Pavilion Restoration Committee.  He has also served as a Director of the Aitkin Bicentennial Exhibition Centre, Special Olympics Canada, Canadian Cancer Society National Public Relations, the Board of Advisors of the International Association for Students of Economic and Commerce, the National Committee on Lobbyists for the Canadian Bar Association (CBA), Life President and class Valedictorian of Dalhousie University, Friends of the London School of Economics, Chair London Goodenough Association of Canada, Board of Governors and Secretary, Patron of Lester B.Pearson College of the Pacific, Victoria, B.C.

Electoral history

Personal life
He is married to P. Wende Cartwright, formerly from Vancouver, and together they have five children. He plays the piano and is an avid snow and water skier.

External links
 

1956 births
Alumni of the London School of Economics
Liberal Party of Canada MPs
Living people
Members of the House of Commons of Canada from New Brunswick
Politicians from Toronto
21st-century Canadian politicians
Canadian politicians of Lebanese descent